The Iere Village Mosque is a mosque in Iere, Princes Town, Trinidad and Tobago.

History
The mosque was originally built in 1868 by immigrants from British Raj who worked at the surrounding estate. In 1968, it was rebuilt to what it is today. Later the mosque was declared a historic building by the government.

See also
 Islam in Trinidad and Tobago

References

1868 establishments in Trinidad and Tobago
Indo-Trinidadian and Tobagonian culture
Mosques completed in 1968
Mosques in Trinidad and Tobago
Trinidad (island)